Restrepophyllum is a genus of fossil foliage attributable to the Zamiaceae. This genus is found in Early Cretaceous rocks from Argentina.

Taxonomy 
The genus was erected based on material from the Anfiteratro de Ticó Formation in Argentina based on a single specimen preserved with cuticle. The name of the genus was chosen to highlight the similarity with Zamia restrepoi (D.W.Stev.) A.Lindstr., a species of Zamia previously segregated in the genus Chigua.

References 

Cycads
Prehistoric gymnosperm genera